The 2003–04 Divizia A was the eighty-sixth season of Divizia A, the top-level football league of Romania. Season began in August 2003 and ended in June 2004. Dinamo București became champions on 3 June 2004.

Team changes

Relegated
The teams that were relegated to Divizia B at the end of the previous season (note that although Oțelul Galați lost the relegation play–off, they remained in Divizia A, after they bought the first division place from the promoted team Petrolul Ploiești, which merged with Astra Ploiești):
 Sportul Studențesc
 UTA Arad

Promoted
The teams that were promoted from Divizia B at the start of the season:
 Petrolul Ploiești
 Apulum Alba Iulia
 FC Oradea

Venues

Personnel and kits

League table

Positions by round

Results

Attendances

Top goalscorers

Champion squad

References

Liga I seasons
Romania
1